The Men's 1979 European Amateur Boxing Championships were held in  Cologne, West Germany from May 5 to May 12, 1979. The 23rd edition of the bi-annual competition was organised by the European governing body for amateur boxing, EABA. There were 146 fighters from across many European countries participated in the competition.

The Heavyweight (– 91 kilograms) and Super Heavyweight (+ 91 kilograms) categories were contested for the first time.

Medal winners

Medal table

References

European Amateur Boxing Championships
Boxing
European Amateur Boxing Championships
International boxing competitions hosted by Germany
International sports competitions hosted by West Germany
European Amateur Boxing Championships
Sports competitions in Cologne
1970s in Cologne